The 1980 Daihatsu Challenge was a women's singles tennis tournament played on indoor carpet courts at the Brighton Centre in Brighton in England. The event was part of the AAA category of the 1980 Colgate Series. It was the third edition of the tournament and was held from 20 October through 25 October 1980. First-seeded Chris Evert-Lloyd won the singles title and earned $22,000 first-prize money.

Finals

Singles
 Chris Evert-Lloyd defeated  Martina Navratilova 6–4, 5–7, 6–3
It was Evert-Lloyd's 8th singles title of the year and the 101st of her career.

Doubles
 Kathy Jordan /  Anne Smith defeated  Martina Navratilova /  Betty Stöve 6–3, 7–5

Prize money

Notes

References

External links
 International Tennis Federation (ITF) tournament event details
 Tournament draws

Daihatsu Challenge
Daihatsu Challenge
Brighton International
Daihatsu Challenge
Daihatsu Challenge